Jordan Eagers (born 3 January 1989) is an English footballer who played as a midfielder for Sheffield F.C..

Playing career

Sheffield United
Eagers started his career as a junior player with local side Sheffield United where he spent three seasons playing in the youth sides and the reserves.

IFK Mariehamn
In April 2008, Eagers was signed by IFK Mariehamn in Finland on a short-term deal to progress his career and gain first team experience. Having played thirteen games he returned to England when his initial deal was up.

Sheffield F.C.
On returning home Eagers signed for local side Sheffield F.C. of the Northern Premier League Division One South.

References

1989 births
Living people
English footballers
English expatriate footballers
Veikkausliiga players
Sheffield United F.C. players
IFK Mariehamn players
Sheffield F.C. players
Expatriate footballers in Finland
Association football midfielders